Indian River is the name of two rivers in the U.S. state of Michigan:

 Indian River (Manistique River), in Alger and Schoolcraft counties in the Upper Peninsula
 Indian River (Mullett Lake), in Cheboygan County in the Lower Peninsula

See also 
 Indian River, Michigan, an unincorporated community in Cheboygan County
 Little Indian River (Michigan), a tributary of Indian River in the Upper Peninsula

Rivers of Michigan
Set index articles on rivers of Michigan